The year 2007 is the 11th and final year in the history of the Pride Fighting Championships, a mixed martial arts promotion based in Japan. 2007 had 2 events beginning with, Pride 33 - The Second Coming.

Title fights

Debut Pride FC fighters

The following fighters fought their first Pride FC fight in 2007:

 Brian Lo-A-Njoe
 Edson Drago
 James Lee
 Jason Ireland

 Jeff Monson
 Mac Danzig
 Mike Russow
 Nick Diaz

 Rameau Thierry Sokoudjou
 Travis Wiuff
 Zelg Galesic
 Zuluzinho

Events list

Pride 33 - The Second Coming

Pride 34 - Kamikaze

See also
 Pride Fighting Championships
 List of Pride Fighting Championships champions
 List of Pride Fighting events

References

Pride Fighting Championships events
2007 in mixed martial arts